, better known by his pen name , is a Japanese manga artist. Sakuishi has a wide variety of interests which include baseball (he is a huge Chunichi Dragons fan), martial arts, MMA, and music (he is a huge Red Hot Chili Peppers fan). Each of these has become the basis for his most popular series (baseball in Stopper Busujima, fighting in Bakaichi, and music in Beck). His series also often include character cameos from his past works; one of the newspaper reporters in Beck is actually from Stopper Busujima and so on. Additionally, he's a big fan of Sangokushi (Romance of the Three Kingdoms) with an altered version of that story appearing in Beck written by "Christy Sakuishi". In Beck he included many famous people in background crowds. These included many popular musicians, characters from Happy Sangokushi and MMA legends Royce Gracie and Kazushi Sakuraba.

Bibliography
 , Weekly Young Magazine (1988 - 1994), collected in 19 volumes
 Bakaichi (1995)
 Stopper Busujima (1996)
 Beck (1999 – 2008)
 , Big Comic Spirits (2009 - 2011), collected in 12 volumes
, Weekly Young Magazine (2016 -)
 , Monthly Shōnen Magazine (2013 - 2016), collected in 14 volumes

Video games
 Heavy Metal Thunder (2005)

Awards
 7th Tetsuya Chiba Excellent Newcomer Award - Souwaikan (1987)
 14th Kodansha Manga Award, general category - Gorillaman (1990)
 26th Kodansha Manga Award, shōnen category - Beck (2002)
 2018 International Spotlight Award from the Harvey Awards

References

External links
 
 Profile at The Ultimate Manga Guide 
 

Manga artists from Aichi Prefecture
Winner of Kodansha Manga Award (Shōnen)
Winner of Kodansha Manga Award (General)
1966 births
Living people
People from Kasugai, Aichi
Pseudonymous artists
Harvey Award winners